ITV Select was a pay-per-view channel that was owned by Carlton Communications and Granada plc. The channel launched on 1 May 2000 as ONrequest and showed films, sport events and exclusive footage. As of July 2000, content was provided under a contract by Universal and Paramount Studios. The service was rebranded as ITV Select in 2001 and closed on 23 April 2002, shortly before the collapse of ITV Digital.

References

See also
 ITV Digital

Defunct television channels in the United Kingdom
ITV (TV network)
Pay-per-view television channels in the United Kingdom
Movie channels in the United Kingdom
Sports television in the United Kingdom
Television channels and stations established in 2000
Television channels and stations disestablished in 2002